The S9 district lies within in the City of Sheffield, South Yorkshire, England.  The district contains 52 listed buildings that are recorded in the National Heritage List for England.  Of these, 3 are listed at Grade II*, the middle grade, and the others are at Grade II, the lowest grade.  The district is in the north east of the city of Sheffield, and covers the areas of Attercliffe, Brightside, Carbrook, Darnall, Meadowhall, Tinsley and Wincobank.

For neighbouring areas, see listed buildings in S2, listed buildings in S4, listed buildings in S5, listed buildings in S13, listed buildings in Brinsworth, listed buildings in Rotherham (Boston Castle Ward), listed buildings in Rotherham (Keppel Ward) and listed buildings in Rotherham (West Ward).



Key

Buildings

References 

 - A list of all the listed buildings within Sheffield City Council's boundary is available to download from this page.

Sources

 S9
Sheffield S09